Helen Catherine Wan (born January 29, 1973) is a Taiwanese-American novelist and lawyer. She is the author of the 2013 novel The Partner Track, the story of a young Chinese-American woman poised to become the first minority female partner at a powerful, prestigious corporate law firm and the basis for the 2022 series Partner Track.

Background
Wan was born in California and raised near Washington, D.C. by parents Peter and Catherine Wan who were originally from Taiwan and had met there, immigrating to the United States in the 1960s. She also graduated from The Thomas Jefferson High School for Science and Technology, Amherst College, and The University of Virginia School of Law.

Prior to becoming a full-time author and lecturer, she was Associate General Counsel at the Time Inc. division of Time Warner Inc. and a corporate and media attorney at the law firms Frankfurt Kurnit Klein & Selz, P.C. and Paul, Weiss, Rifkind, Wharton & Garrison LLP, and practised media and corporate law in New York City for over fifteen years.

Writing
Wan's novel, The Partner Track, was first published by St. Martin's Press in September 2013 and became the subject of a Washington Post Magazine cover story, has been optioned for television, and is now being taught in law schools and universities. Wan is also a frequently invited speaker at corporations, law firms, law schools, universities, leadership and diversity conferences, and bar associations on diversity and inclusion in corporate America and advancing the careers of women, Asian Americans and women of color. She has also been a contributor to CNN, The Washington Post, The Daily Beast, The Huffington Post, and many other publications.

References

External links
Helen Wan's Official Website
Above The Law Interview with Helen Wan

1973 births
21st-century American novelists
Living people
Amherst College alumni
American writers of Taiwanese descent
American women writers of Chinese descent
American women novelists
American women lawyers
Thomas Jefferson High School for Science and Technology alumni
University of Virginia School of Law alumni
21st-century American women writers
American novelists of Chinese descent